GRR may refer to:

Transport 
 Agroar Carga Aérea, a defunct Portuguese airline
 Gadalar railway station, in Pakistan
 Georgetown Railroad, in Texas
 Gerald R. Ford International Airport, in Grand Rapids, Michigan
 Grand River Railway, in Ontario, Canada
 Vernon J. Ehlers Station, in Grand Rapids, Michigan

Other uses 
 Gainesville Roller Rebels, an American roller derby league
 Gate River Run, a running race in Jacksonville, Florida
 Gender Recognition Reform (Scotland) Bill
 Gradual release of responsibility
 Green Reefers, a Norwegian shipping company
 Gross reproduction rate
 Grothendieck–Riemann–Roch theorem
 Gurara language, a Berber language of Algeria with the ISO 639-3 code grr

See also
 Grrr (disambiguation)